"Shapes of Love / Never Stop!" is a single by the Japanese J-pop group Every Little Thing, released as their sixth single on October 22, 1997. It was used as the theme song for the drama Kenshūi Nanako.

Track listing
 Shapes of Love (Words & music - Mitsuru Igarashi) 
 Never Stop! (27 hours version) (Words - Kaori Mochida / music - Mitsuru Igarashi) 
 Shapes of Love (instrumental)
 Never Stop! (27 hours version) (instrumental)

Chart positions

External links
 Shapes of Love / Never Stop! information at Avex Network.
 Shapes of Love / Never Stop! information at Oricon.

1997 singles
Every Little Thing (band) songs
Songs written by Mitsuru Igarashi
Japanese television drama theme songs
1997 songs
Avex Trax singles